The Mortier de 81mm léger long renforcé (LLR 81 mm) is a mortar used by the French Army, manufactured by Thales. Introduced in 1997, it is the latest iteration of the TDA 81 mm light mortar family.

Description 
The original TDA 81 mm was designed in 1961 (hence the MO-81-61 designation). Since then, three variants have been fielded:
 the 81mm LC or MO-81-61-C (Léger court, "light short"), with a 1.15-metre barrel;
 the 81mm LL or MO-81-61-L (Léger long, "light long"), with a 1.55-metre barrel;
 the 81mm LLR (Léger long renforcé, "light long reinforced"), paratrooper version with a 1.55-metre barrel.

The LLR 81mm is composed of a base plate, a barrel comprising the breech, and a bipod. It can use the same pointing optics as the MO-120-RT-61.

The LLR 81mm can be parachuted either piece by piece, in a kit comprising a dismantled weapon and ammunition, or in larger crates comprising several weapons. The barrel was reinforced so as to allow firing of all existing 81 mm mortar ammunition.

Users
 : MO-81-61
: MO-81-61-C and MO-81-LLR (2 per infantry company of the French Army in the 2010s)
: light long-barrel version
 : MO-81-LL built under license by OTO Melara
 : South African M8 mortar
 : South African M8 mortar version
 : MO-81-LL built under license
 : South African M8 mortar
 : MO-81-61 produced by Vektor as M3 mortar and M8 mortar (upgraded variant with heavier barrel).

External links

Bibliography 

Mortars of France
Post–Cold War artillery of France
Infantry mortars
81mm mortars
Military equipment introduced in the 1990s